Paula Holmqvist (born 1964) is a Swedish politician. She serves as member of the Riksdag , representing the constituency of Västra Götaland County North.

References 

Living people
1964 births
Place of birth missing (living people)
21st-century Swedish politicians
21st-century Swedish women politicians
Members of the Riksdag 2014–2018
Members of the Riksdag 2018–2022
Members of the Riksdag 2022–2026
Members of the Riksdag from the Social Democrats
Women members of the Riksdag